Cheltenham Township is a home rule township in Montgomery County, Pennsylvania, United States. Cheltenham's population density ranges from over 10,000 per square mile (25,900 per square kilometer) in rowhouses and high-rise apartments along Cheltenham Avenue to historic neighborhoods in Wyncote and Elkins Park. It is the most densely populated township in Montgomery County. The population was 36,793 at the 2010 U.S. Census, making it the third most populous township in Montgomery County and the 27th most populous municipality in Pennsylvania. It was originally part of Philadelphia County, and it became part of Montgomery County upon that county's creation in 1784.

Cheltenham is located five miles from Center City Philadelphia and is surrounded by the North and Northeast sections of Philadelphia, Abington, Jenkintown, and Springfield. The SEPTA Main Line passes through Cheltenham via 5 regional rail stations, some of which are the busiest in the SEPTA system. Cheltenham is served by the SEPTA City Transit Division and is adjacent to Fern Rock Transportation Center and the Broad Street Line subway which terminates at the South Philadelphia Sports Complex and also the Frankford Transportation Center and the El, which terminates at 69th Street in Upper Darby Township. The northern terminus of Broad Street is in Cheltenham, at its intersection with Cheltenham Avenue (Pennsylvania Route 309).

History

Early history
Cheltenham was established in 1682 as part of Philadelphia County by 15 Quakers from Cheltenham, England, including Richard Wall and Tobias Leech, who purchased  of land from William Penn. Upon creation of Montgomery County in 1784, Cheltenham became the smallest township in the new county.

The following is the list of the 15 original founders of Cheltenham Township

From early in its history, Cheltenham was fueled by the development of various mills along Tookany Creek. Communities and villages grew around these mills and formed what is now modern Cheltenham neighborhoods. The first gristmill was built by Richard Dungworth in 1690. After changing ownership several times, the Rowland family eventually made the mill the second largest producer of shovels in the United States. The site was demolished in 1929.

The U.S. Colored Troops 3rd Regiment were the first to be trained at Camp William Penn. It is tradition that soldiers have a grand parade before leaving for war, but Philadelphia was partially a racist community at that time and the government believed that a parade might cause a riot, so it was cancelled. The leader of the Camp (Colonel Louis Wagner) was furious and made sure the next regiment to come through would have a parade.

Incorporated boroughs and unincorporated districts
Cheltenham Township contains no incorporated areas. Its districts include the communities of Glenside, Laverock, Edge Hill, Wyncote, Cedarbrook, Chelten Hills, La Mott, Elkins Park, Melrose Park, and Cheltenham Village.

Estate development

From the late 19th to early 20th century, Cheltenham established itself as one of the most prominent communities in the Philadelphia area. Railroad tycoon Jay Cooke was one of the first to build his mansion in Cheltenham. His 200-acre estate was eventually converted to a school in 1883 and was later demolished. John Wanamaker built his mansion Lindenhurst, which was destroyed by a fire in 1907. His second Lindenhurst was destroyed by another fire in 1944. Henry Breyer, Jr. eventually bought the land from Wanamaker. Other famous mansions built include Abraham Barker's "Lyndon," Cyrus H. K. Curtis's "Curtis Hall," George Horace Lorimer's "Belgrame," and John B. Stetson's "Idro." Perhaps the most famous mansions that still stand to this day are the prominent Widener family mansion Lynnewood Hall, the Elkins Estate which was home to William Elkins, and Grey Towers Castle which was home to William Welsh Harrison. The latter is a National Historic Landmark and was designed by famed architect Horace Trumbauer, who designed many buildings and homes in Cheltenham.

Present

As the Gilded Age ended and the depression hit the country, many of the estates and mansions were destroyed and made way for the building of houses in their place. Many of the communities that were formed in the early stages of Cheltenham remained, and still exist to this day. As the 20th century progressed, many people moved out of the city and into the first community over the city line, Cheltenham. With the population increase, the township's identity evolved from being largely a community of prominent Philadelphians and their mansions to several distinct communities. One of the major groups to come to Cheltenham was Koreans. The original Koreatown was located in the Olney section of Philadelphia, but eventually was moved north to Logan. Large pockets of Koreans were eventually established in Cheltenham, and also in Upper Darby Township and West Philadelphia. Many other races and ethnicities migrated to Cheltenham to make it one of the most diverse municipalities in the Delaware Valley. By the 2000 Census, Cheltenham was one of only two (the other being Norristown) municipalities in Montgomery County that was considered "diverse" (20–60% of the population is non-white).

Cheltenham, along with the other earliest communities in the Philadelphia area such as Upper Darby Township, Haverford, Lower Merion, and Jenkintown have retained their distinct identities while being surrounded by suburbia over the middle to late part of the twentieth century. Cheltenham and Lower Merion are of the few townships in Montgomery County who had a large population prior to the postwar population boom and thus whose majority of houses, communities, and streets have remained virtually unchanged since the early 20th century. Cheltenham has 13 listings on the National Register of Historic Places, the most of any municipality in Montgomery County.
Cheltenham became a township of the first class in 1900. In 1976, it passed a home rule charter that took effect in 1977.

There are many books about Cheltenham Township's history.

 A History of Cheltenham Township by Elaine Rothschild
 Images of America Cheltenham Township by Old York Road Historical Society
 Remembering Cheltenham Township by Donald Scott Sr.
 Making Marathon: A History of Early Wyncote by Thomas J. Wieckowski

Cheltenham was the former home of Cradle of Liberty Council Breyer Training Area. Henry W. Breyer, Jr. used property formerly owned by Cheltenham resident John Wanamaker. It closed in 1990 and is now the home of Salus University.

Cheltenham has been honored with many distinctions over its long history. It was named a Preserve America community, a US Government program established to preserve historic communities throughout the United States. It is also a Tree City USA member, a program dedicated to forestry management. Most recently in 2013, Cheltenham was named a "Classic Town of Greater Philadelphia," for being "one of the most diverse, unique, and livable communities in our region" and "truly at the center of it all."

Township seal
The seal of Cheltenham was adopted from the seal of the namesake and sister city, Cheltenham, England. It appears on all formal documents, resolutions, proclamations, and all legal records or documents. The pigeon on top of a blue sphere represents the founding of the fountain spa which made Cheltenham famous. They are placed above a wreath of Oak leaves. The two books represent Education, in particular, the Pates Grammar School and the Cheltenham College. The silver cross in the middle represents religion. The two pigeons represent the flock that would gather at the spas. Finally, the Oak tree represents the many Oak trees that line the streets of Cheltenham and promenades.

Geography

Cheltenham is a residential township in the southeasternmost part of Montgomery County, which is in Southeastern Pennsylvania (locally known as the Delaware Valley). It also borders Abington Township and Jenkintown on the north side and Springfield Township on the west side.

The area consists of rolling hills and also features a few streams flowing through it, most notably the Tookany Creek. It includes the census-designated places of Arcadia University, Glenside, and Wyncote. Other communities include Cheltenham, Elkins Park, Melrose Park, La Mott and Laverock, Edge Hill, and Cedarbrook. All of the communities form a border with Philadelphia along Cheltenham Avenue.

Communities in Cheltenham

Edge Hill, Laverock, and Cedarbrook's exact populations and land area are uncertain.

Demographics

As of the 2010 census, Cheltenham Township was 56.6% White, 32.8% Black or African American, 0.2% Native American, 7.7% Asian, and 2.5% were two or more races. 3.9% of the population were of Hispanic or Latino ancestry. The median income for a family in Cheltenham in the 2010 Census was $72,584. 

In 2020, the median income for a family in Cheltenham was $129,338 and for a married couple family it was $146,884 vs $123,768 and $139,871 respectively for Montgomery County as a whole.

According to the 2010 Census, 30.4% of the townships households had children under the age of 18 living with them, 53.4% were headed by married couples living together, 10.6% had a female householder with no husband present, and 32.8% were non-families. 27.6% of all households were made up of individuals, and 12.5% had someone living alone who was 65 years of age or older.  The average household size was 2.47 and the average family size was 3.05. The age distribution was 22.8% under 18, 8.5% from 18 to 24, 25.9% from 25 to 44, 24.1% from 45 to 64, and 18.6% who were 65 or older.  The median age was 40 years. For every 100 females, there were 86.3 males.  For every 100 females age 18 and over, there were 81.0 males.

In 2020 the median income for a household in the township was $96,136, up from $61,713 in 2010.  

In 2010, males had a median income of $50,564 versus $36,439 for females. The per capita income for the township in 2010 was $31,424.  About 3.0% of families and 8.4% of the population were below the poverty line, including 6.5% of those under age 18 and 3.2% of those age 65 or over.

Weather
Cheltenham is located on the borderline of the humid subtropical climate (Cfa) and the hot-summer humid continental climate (Dfa) zones. As with most Northeast townships, Cheltenham has four distinct seasons. Summers are warm and have occasional heat waves. Autumn is cool and comfortable. Winters are cold, most days hovering around the freezing mark with nights dipping to the teens. Spring is pleasant with often not too much precipitation. The hardiness zone is 7a.

Just two days later, a second storm came and dropped another .

Politics and government

Cheltenham Township does not have a mayor. Rather it is governed by a Board of Commissioners, who are elected one from each of the township's seven wards for a four-year term. A President of the Board is elected by these commissioners for a one-year term to serve as the head of the government.  Daniel B. Norris is the current Board President. A school board is in charge of the school district.

The township is in the Fourth Congressional District (represented by Rep. Madeleine Dean), and Pennsylvania's 154th Representative District (represented by Rep. Napoleon Nelson). It is also in Pennsylvania's 4th Senatorial District (represented by Sen. Arthur L. Haywood III).

Cheltenham is currently a very Democratic heavy community, winning by large margins in each of the past six presidential elections. The only municipality in Montgomery County in the 2012 election that had a higher Democratic voting percentage was Norristown's 82.99%, compared to Cheltenham's 80.85%.

Cheltenham is one of only seven Townships in Pennsylvania, and of 29 municipalities in the entire state, to prohibit discrimination on the basis of sexual orientation and gender identity by executive order.

Commissioners
The following is a table of the current commissioners of Cheltenham Township along with their Wards and the areas of the township they serve:

Education 

The Cheltenham Township School District serves the township. There are seven public schools and a number of private schools. Public schools include Cheltenham Elementary School (k-4), Myers Elementary School (k-4), Glenside Elementary School (k-4), Wyncote Elementary School (k-4), Elkins Park School (5–6), Cedarbrook Middle School (7–8), and Cheltenham High School (9–12).

The largest private high school in Cheltenham Township is Bishop McDevitt High School (9–12) which is under the Roman Catholic Archdiocese of Philadelphia. Other private schools include Wyncote Academy, Perelman Jewish Day School, Mesivta Yesodei Yisroel of Elkins Park, Ancillae-Assumpta Academy, Presentation B.V.M. School and Gospel of Grace Christian School.

The section of Elkins Park in Cheltenham is the former home of Tyler School of Art, a conceptual fine-arts school that is part of Temple University.  Cheltenham is also home to Arcadia University (formerly known as Beaver College), Salus University (formerly known as The Pennsylvania College of Optometry), Westminster Theological Seminary, Gratz College and Reconstructionist Rabbinical College, the only seminary affiliated with Reconstructionist Judaism. Cheltenham was also the former home of the Oak Lane Day School for 44 years until it moved to its current home in Blue Bell.

Infrastructure

Transportation

Regional Rail
Cheltenham is a major thoroughfare for SEPTA Regional Rail. All trains going north of Center City (with the exception of the Trenton Line) pass through Cheltenham. This includes the Airport Line, Lansdale/Doylestown Line, West Trenton Line, Warminster Line and the Fox Chase Line. Following Cheltenham, many of the lines split to their respective destinations, which makes Cheltenham stations some of the busiest in Montgomery County. The stations carry the names of the neighborhoods in which they are located: Elkins Park, Glenside, and Melrose Park. Jenkintown-Wyncote and Cheltenham straddle the township's border.

Buses
Cheltenham is served by many SEPTA City Division buses. Many of the buses originate at the Cheltenham-Ogontz Bus Loop, which is located at the northwest corner of the intersection of Ogontz Avenue (Pennsylvania Route 309) and Cheltenham Avenue. The loop is across the street from Greenleaf at Cheltenham, which attracts many shoppers from North Philadelphia. Several other buses run throughout other major streets in the township, as well as residential streets. The following routes are in Cheltenham:

 6 – connects Cheltenham-Ogontz with Olney Transportation Center via Broad Street.
 16 – connects Cheltenham-Ogontz with Center City at 15th and Market (Suburban Station) via Broad Street.
 18 – third busiest bus route in the SEPTA system, connects Cedarbrook Shopping Center with Fox Chase via Olney.
 22 – connects Willow Grove and Warminster to Olney Transportation Center via Easton Road.
 24 – connects Rockledge and Southampton with Frankford Transportation Center via Huntingdon Pike.
 28 – connects Fern Rock Transportation Center with Torresdale-Cottman via Rhawn Street.
 55 – connects Willow Grove and Doylestown with Olney Transportation Center via Easton and Old York Road.
 57 – connects Whitman Plaza with Rising Sun/Olney or Fern Rock via 3rd & 4th Street.
 70 – connects Fern Rock with Frankford-Gregg via Cottman Avenue
 77 – connects Chestnut Hill with Roosevelt Boulevard via Township Line Road
 80 – express connect between Horsham and Olney Transportation Center via Limekiln Pike.
 H – connects Cheltenham-Ogontz with Broad-Erie via West Mount Airy
 XH – connects Cheltenham-Ogontz with Broad-Erie via Germantown.

Cheltenham ranked in the top three municipalities in Montgomery County for percentage of population who uses Bus/Trolley and Regional Rail.

In addition, Cheltenham Township partners with the Montgomery County-sponsored Suburban Transit Network, Inc. (TransNet) to subsidize free transportation for residents ages 65 and older anywhere in the Township on Mondays through Fridays from 9 am to 3:30 pm.

 Taiwanese airline EVA Air provides a private bus service to and from John F. Kennedy International Airport in New York City for customers based in the Philadelphia area. It stops in Cheltenham.

Roads

There are several major roads in Cheltenham Township. Cheltenham Avenue is a major roadway and is an easy access point to many of the other roadways like Pennsylvania Route 611 and Pennsylvania Route 309. It is also the border between Cheltenham Township, Montgomery County, Pennsylvania and the City of Philadelphia, Philadelphia County, Pennsylvania. Cheltenham Avenue ends on the westside at Paper Mill Road in Wyndmoor, Pennsylvania which is part of Springfield Township. Pennsylvania Route 73 is one of the major roadways in Cheltenham Township, known as 'Church Road' and 'Township Line Road' because it is the border line between Cheltenham and Abington Townships. Pennsylvania Route 309 starts in Cheltenham Township and serves as a major highway. It goes through multiple counties and ends up in PA 29 in Monroe Township in Wyoming County. Pennsylvania Route 152 starts in Cheltenham Township and is known as 'Limekiln Pike.' It ends on the north end of Pennsylvania Route 309 in Telford. Pennsylvania Route 611 starts in Philadelphia and runs through Cheltenham Township as Old York Road. It is the main access road to Willow Grove in Abington and Upper Moreland Townships.

Many of the roads in Philadelphia continue into Cheltenham such as Old York Road, Willow Grove Avenue, Limekiln Pike, Ogontz Avenue, Washington Lane, 12th Street, Oak Lane, Oak Lane Road, 2nd Street, Hasbrook Avenue, Cottman Avenue, Central Avenue, Ryers Avenue and Church Road.

Cheltenham was one of several communities in Pennsylvania to make the United States Main Street Program. Locations receiving this honor were:

Glenside – Easton Road from Arcadia University north to Mt. Carmel Avenue, and Glenside Avenue between Limekiln Pike and Keswick Avenue, and Rices Mill Road and Glenside Avenue.
Cheltenham Village – Central and Ryers Avenues between Cottman Avenue and Old Soldiers Road, and Cottman Avenue between Hasbrook Avenue and the Church Road vicinity.
East Cheltenham Avenue – East Cheltenham Avenue from the SEPTA train tracks to Bell Mawr Road.
Elkins Park East – High School Road and Montgomery Avenue area.
Elkins Park West – Old York Road between Township Line Road and Chelten Hills Drive, and Church Road between Brookside Road and the train tracks.

Fire services
The Cheltenham Township Fire Department consists of five all volunteer fire companies.
 Glenside Fire Company
 La Mott Fire Company
 Elkins Park Fire Company
 Cheltenham Hook & Ladder Company
 Ogontz Fire Company

Police
The Cheltenham Police Department was founded in 1903.  In 2008, the department responded to over 25,000 calls.  With 73 full-time sworn officers in 2016, the department is the third largest in Montgomery County.

In 2016, a member of canine unit, Odie, was the top-ranked explosives detection dog in the United States.

Libraries
Cheltenham Township has four libraries, which are the East Cheltenham Free Library, Elkins Park Free Library, La Mott Free Library, and the Glenside Free library.

Notable people

Jay Ansill, composer and folk musician
Eddie Applegate, actor
Samuel Arbuckle, California politician, served on the Los Angeles County Board of Supervisors
Abraham Barker, soldier during the Civil War, U.S. House of Representatives member
Chris Bartlett, activist and executive director of the William Way Community Center
Michael Baylson, Senior Federal Judge on the United States District Court for the Eastern District of Pennsylvania
Brandon Bing, professional football player for the New York Giants
Robert Hood Bowers, composer and conductor
Michael Brecker, saxophonist
Randy Brecker, jazz, rock, and R&B trumpeter
Justin Brown, NFL wide receiver
Michael Stuart Brown, physician, geneticist, and Nobel laureate in Physiology or Medicine
Jim Callahan, NFL player, writer, and member of the Temple University Hall of Fame
Ibraheim Campbell, Cleveland Browns safety, Northwestern football alumni
George Castle, son of J.R. Castle, professional lacrosse player for the Philadelphia Wings
J.R. Castle, former lacrosse player
Noam Chomsky, theoretical linguist and political activist
Laurie Colwin, author and columnist
Chris Conlin, All-American football player at Penn State
Jay Cooke, financier – had his "country estate" in Chelten Hills
Bill Cosby, comedian
Rebecca Creskoff, actress
Cyrus H. K. Curtis, founder of the Curtis Publishing Company, which published The Saturday Evening Post and Ladies Home Journal
Louisa Knapp Curtis, columnist and first editor of Ladies Home Journal
Fitz Eugene Dixon Jr., son of banker Fitz Eugene Dixon Sr. and Eleanor Widener (member of the Widener family) 
Tony Donatelli, soccer player for VSI Tampa Bay FC
William Lukens Elkins, prominent role in history of the Pennsylvania Railroad, SEPTA and several other railroads.
Josh Fattal, hiker detained in Iran from 2009 to 2011
Tom Feeney, member of Congress, R-FL
Douglas Feith, former Under-Secretary of Defense
Stuart F. Feldman, co-founder of Vietnam Veterans of America.
Marian Filar, Polish-born American-based concert pianist and virtuoso
Glenn A. Fine, Inspector General, United States Department of Justice
Wilmot E. Fleming, State Senator
Jim Foster, Hall of Fame women's basketball coach at St. Joseph's, Vanderbilt, Ohio State, and Chattanooga. 
Jon D. Fox, U.S. Congressman
Benjamin Hallowell, first president of the Maryland Agricultural College
Laura Harper, professional basketball player
Marvin Harrison, NFL wide receiver
Alfred Hunt, first president of the Bethlehem Iron Company, later to become Bethlehem Steel
Trina Schart Hyman, artist and illustrator
Bill Hyndman, amateur golfer
Clifford C. Ireland, U.S. Representative
Reggie Jackson, Hall of Fame baseball player and actor – grew up in township
Charles Wellford Leavitt, urban planner, architect, and engineer who designed Forbes Field and much of Columbia University
Mark Levin, conservative talk radio host and attorney
Richard Levinson, Emmy Award-winning writer and producer
Chad Levitt, NFL football player
Franz Lidz, journalist whose memoir, Unstrung Heroes, became a 1995 feature film directed by Diane Keaton
Lil Dicky, born Dave Burd, rapper and comedian
William Link, Emmy Award-winning writer and producer
Craig Littlepage, college administrator and educator
John Luther Long, lawyer and writer, best known for short story "Madame Butterfly"
Jeff Lorber, musician
George Horace Lorimer, longtime editor of The Saturday Evening Post
Bernie Lowe, founder of Cameo Records
Joel Keith Mann, PA House Representative, PA State Senator, U.S. House of Representatives
Mary Ellen Mark, photographer
John Charles Martin, newspaper publisher
Edgar Lee Masters, lawyer and author of the Spoon River Anthology – spent final years and died in Elkins Park
Steve McCarter, member of the Pennsylvania House of Representatives, representing the 154th legislative district
Pat Meehan, US Politician representing Pennsylvania's 7th congressional district
Humphrey Morrey, founder of Cheltenham, first Mayor of Philadelphia
Lucretia Coffin Mott, prominent feminist, abolitionist, and Quaker)
Robert J. Myers, co-creator of United States Social Security program
Benjamin Netanyahu, currently serves his second term as Israeli prime minister – lived in township during high school
Yonatan Netanyahu, Israeli war hero who died saving Jewish hostages in Operation Entebbe
Ron Perelman, businessman, 26th richest American
Ezra Pound, poet – grew up in township
Jesse Purnell, professional baseball player for the Philadelphia Phillies
Ralph J. Roberts, co-founder of Comcast, father of current Comcast CEO, Brian L. Roberts
David Saxon, physicist, educator and administrator
Ronald M. Shapiro, sports agent, corporate attorney, New York Times best-selling author
Robert C. Solomon, PhD, author and educator
Jeffrey Solow, virtuoso cellist
Jeffrey Sonnenfeld, Senior Associate Dean for Executive Programs and Lester Crown Professor in the Practice of Management at Yale
Dan Trachtenberg, filmmaker and podcast host.  He directed the 2016 horror-thriller film 10 Cloverfield Lane
Wallace Triplett, professional football player
David Uosikkinen, drummer for rock band The Hooters
Kate Vrijmoet, artist
John Wanamaker, businessman sometimes called the father of the department store – had a second home in the township
Richard Ward, actor
Paul Westhead, NBA championship-winning coach, taught English at Cheltenham High School in the 1960s
Thomas Wharton Jr., first Governor of Pennsylvania
George Dunton Widener, Philadelphia businessman who died in the sinking of the Titanic
George Dunton Widener, Jr., businessman, thoroughbred horse racer
Gertrude Widener, thoroughbred racehorse owner and breeder
Harry Elkins Widener, businessman who died on the Titanic; Harvard University's Widener Memorial Library was built in his honor
Joseph E. Widener, businessman, founding benefactor of National Gallery of Art
Peter A.B. Widener, head of the prominent Widener family
Chris Williams, professional soccer player for Miami FC
George Wilson, Hall of Fame collegiate football player
Stan Yerkes, professional baseball player

Fictional residents
 Betty Draper, Mad Men character who was raised in the "tiny Philadelphia suburb of Elkins Park, Pennsylvania."

Miscellaneous
Cheltenham has its own Public-access television cable TV channel, Channel 42 (Cheltenham School District/Township) on Comcast Cablevision and Channel 1960 on Verizon FiOS.
The Fox sitcom 'Til Death is set in Cheltenham.
The movie The in Crowd was filmed partly at Cheltenham High School.

Other Cheltenhams
Cheltenham is officially twinned with their namesake, Cheltenham, England. There are also five other places in the world named "Cheltenham."
 Cheltenham, England (Official Twin and Namesake)
 Cheltenham, St. Louis, Missouri, United States
 Cheltenham, Ontario, Canada
 Cheltenham, Auckland, New Zealand
 Cheltenham, New South Wales, Australia
 Cheltenham, Victoria, Australia

Points of interest

Pennsylvania Historic Site
 Camp William Penn

Other points of interest
 Lynnewood Hall
 Elkins Estate
 Holy Sepulchre Cemetery

See also

Koreatown, Philadelphia
U.S. cities with large African-American populations

References

External links

 

 
1682 establishments in Pennsylvania
Home Rule Municipalities in Montgomery County, Pennsylvania
Populated places established in 1682
Populated places on the Underground Railroad
Townships in Montgomery County, Pennsylvania
Townships in Pennsylvania